The Journal of International Law and International Relations (JILIR) is an inter-disciplinary, student-run peer-reviewed academic journal at the University of Toronto. It is a joint project of the Faculty of Law and the Munk School of Global Affairs. The journal was the 5th (of 67) most cited Canadian law journal in 2010 according to the Washington and Lee University Law Journal Rankings. JILIR was founded in 2004, and has since published 12 volumes, each with between one or two issues. It focuses primarily on interdisciplinary discourse at the nexus of international law and international relations. In promoting critical, informed, and interdisciplinary debate on international affairs, JILIR provides a forum for the advancement of knowledge, ideas, dialectic, and dialogue in both international law and international relations. JILIR also publishes shorter online content authored by academics, practitioners, and students.  

University of Toronto
Canadian law journals
International relations journals
Publications established in 2004
Law journals edited by students
2004 establishments in Ontario